Kaushut is a village in the Ahal Province of Turkmenistan.

History 
The site was surveyed between 1946 and 1967. It was one of the largest settlements in the Hellenistic era.

To the west of the village, lies a citadel of irregular plan. Known in Turkmen as Khusrau Kala, this is dated to post-Parthian times and probably served as the summer residence of Khosrow I. Besides the citadel, are the ruins of a walled settlement.

Transport 
There is an eponymous halt-station.

References 

Populated places in Ahal Region